Mocquard's small-eyed snake (Hydrablabes praefrontalis) is a terrestrial species of natricine snake found in forests in Malaysia,
Indonesia, and Brunei.

References

Hydrablabes
Reptiles of Malaysia
Reptiles of Indonesia
Reptiles of Brunei
Reptiles described in 1890
Taxa named by François Mocquard
Reptiles of Borneo